Robin Rae (born 18 January 1964, in Musselburgh) is a Scottish former football goalkeeper, who played for Hibernian, Morton, Hamilton and Berwick in the Scottish Football League. Rae also represented Scotland at youth international level and he played in the team that won the UEFA European Under-18 Football Championship in 1982.

Rae also played as a centre forward in junior football.

References

External links 

Robin Rae, www.ihibs.co.uk

1964 births
Living people
Sportspeople from Musselburgh
Association football goalkeepers
Scottish footballers
Hibernian F.C. players
Greenock Morton F.C. players
Hamilton Academical F.C. players
Berwick Rangers F.C. players
Scottish Football League players
Scottish Junior Football Association players
Bonnyrigg Rose Athletic F.C. players
Scotland youth international footballers
Footballers from East Lothian